The following are the national records in athletics in Barbados maintained by its national athletics federation: Athletics Association of Barbados (AAB).

Outdoor

Key to tables:

+ = en route to a longer distance

h = hand timing

A = affected by altitude

OT = oversized track (> 200m in circumference)

Men

Women

Indoor

Men

Women

Notes

References
General
Barbadian Outdoor Records 1 January 2018 updated
Specific

External links
AAB web site

Barbadian
Records
Athletics